Kindwiller is a commune in the Bas-Rhin department in Grand Est, France.

Geography
The village is positioned some fifteen kilometres (nine miles) to the west-north-west of Haguenau.

Most of the houses are on the single main street.   Outside the village the land is mostly used for farming.

History
The first surviving record of the village dates from 1317 when it was named as Kintwilre, the residence of a family of that same name.  The area was at that time owned by Haguenau.   The High German name "Kindweiler" emerges later.

During the wars of religion that spilled into Alsace in the sixteenth century, the village became protestant in 1545 but reverted to Catholicism in 1561.

Kindwiller also enjoyed the privileges of an imperial village.

See also
 Communes of the Bas-Rhin department

References

Communes of Bas-Rhin
Bas-Rhin communes articles needing translation from French Wikipedia
Imperial Villages